The Europe Zone was one of the two regional zones of the 1937 International Lawn Tennis Challenge.

20 teams entered the Europe Zone, with the winner going on to compete in the Inter-Zonal Final against the winner of the America Zone. Germany defeated Czechoslovakia in the final, and went on to face the United States in the Inter-Zonal Final.

Draw

First round

Hungary vs. Belgium

Switzerland vs. Ireland

Netherlands vs. South Africa

China vs. New Zealand

Second round

Germany vs. Austria

Italy vs. Monaco

Sweden vs. Greece

Belgium vs. Switzerland

South Africa vs. New Zealand

Yugoslavia vs. Romania

Poland vs. Czechoslovakia

France vs. Norway

Quarterfinals

Italy vs. Germany

Belgium vs. Sweden

Yugoslavia vs. South Africa

Czechoslovakia vs. France

Semifinals

Germany vs. Belgium

Czechoslovakia vs. Yugoslavia

Final

Germany vs. Czechoslovakia

References

External links
Davis Cup official website

Davis Cup Europe/Africa Zone
Europe Zone
International Lawn Tennis Challenge